Breakey is a surname. Notable people with the surname include:

James Breakey (1865–1952), Canadian politician
John Denis Breakey (1899–1965), British Royal Air Force officer
Kate Breakey (born 1957), Australian photographer
Richard Breakey (born 1956), Scottish rugby union player